Vera (minor planet designation: 245 Vera) is a large Main belt asteroid. It was discovered by N. R. Pogson on February 6, 1885, in Madras, and was named at the suggestion of his wife. The orbital plane is tilted at an angle of 5.16° to the plane of the ecliptic. In 1890, Daniel Kirkwood noted that this asteroid shares similar orbital elements with 86 Semele and 106 Dione.

It is classified as a stony S-type asteroid in the Tholen system. The asteroid has an estimated diameter of  based on near infrared observations.

References

Further reading
The Asteroid Orbital Elements Database
Asteroid Lightcurve Data File
Scaling the magnitude: the fall and rise of N. R. Pogson pg. 243

External links
 
 

Background asteroids
Vera
Vera
S-type asteroids (Tholen)
S-type asteroids (SMASS)
18850206